El zurdo is a 1965 Mexican drama film directed by Arturo Martínez and starring Rodolfo de Anda with Germán Robles, Andrés Soler, Noé Murayama and special performances by Ofelia Montesco, Francisco Avitia, and Irma Serrano.

Cast
Rodolfo de Anda as Pedro "El zurdo"		
Ofelia Montesco as Victoria		
Francisco Avitia as Pancho
Irma Serrano as Catalina		
Andrés Soler as Padre Gil		
Germán Robles as Nazario		
Noé Murayama as Modesto		
Pepito Velázquez as Mario
Pedro Weber "Chatanuga" as Mario's Father
Manuel Tamés "Regulo" as Donkey Owner
Martha Flores as Waitress
José L. Murillo as Horse Race Judge
Eduardo Lugo as Pancracio
Emilio Garibay as Bettor
Celia Tejeda as Pancho's Wife
Antonio Padilla "Picoro" as Horse Race Announcer
Mario Sevilla as Poker Player (uncredited)
Jesús Gómez as Bettor (uncredited)
Victorio Blanco as Bettor (uncredited)

External links

Mexican drama films
1960s Spanish-language films
1960s Mexican films